The 2024 United States Senate election in Hawaii will be held on November 5, 2024, to elect a member of the United States Senate to represent the state of Hawaii. Incumbent two-term Democratic Senator Mazie Hirono was re-elected with 71.2% of the vote in 2018.

Democratic primary

Candidates

Declared
Mazie Hirono, incumbent U.S. Senator

Republican primary

Potential
Rocky De La Fuente, businessman and perennial candidate

General election

Predictions

References

External links
Official campaign websites
Mazie Hirono (D) for Senate

2024
Hawaii
United States Senate